The Bregenz Forest Mountains, also the Bregenzerwald Mountains, are a range of the Northern Limestone Alps and Eastern Alps, named after the town of Bregenz. The Bregenz Forest Mountains are located entirely in the Austrian state of Vorarlberg.

Definition 
The term Bregenz Forest Mountains refers to the range according to the Alpine Club classification of the Eastern Alps (AVE); the term Bregenz Forest, by contrast, refers to a landscape or region which is part of the Bregenzer Ache basin area. As a result, the Bregenz Forest Mountains and the Bregenz Forest are not conterminous.

The Bregenz Forest region also includes the southwestern parts of the Allgäu Alps. On the other hand, the Bregenz Forest Mountains reach, to an extent, into the landscapes of the eastern Rhine Valley, as well as to the Walgau Valley of the Ill River and the Großes Walsertal in the south.

As the range is not geologically uniform, the name is rarely used outside of Alpine literature, is also not used in Vorarlberg state geography and land-use planning and belongs to one of the most disputed mountain groups in the AVE. According to an alternative orographically and hydrologically-oriented mountain range classification (Hubert Trimmel, 1962), the mountains belong to a Rhine Valley–Walgau–Bregenz Forest group.

Geography
The mountain range is part of a landscape arranged in several tiers rising from the Rhine Valley in the west up to the adjacent Lechquellen Mountains. Most of the area is shaped by a Mittelgebirge character with extended forests and Alpine pastures, except for small High Alpine region in the southeast.

Neighbouring ranges

The Bregenz Forest Mountains are bordered by the following other Alpine ranges:
 Allgäu Alps (to the north and east)
 Lechquellen Mountains (to the south)
 Rätikon (to the southwest)
 Appenzell Alps (to the west)

Peaks

The main peaks of the Bregenz Forest Mountains include the following: see Coordinates Bregenz Forest Mountains
 Glatthorn, 2,134 m
 Damülser Mittagsspitze, 2,095 m
 Diedamskopf 2,090 m
 Türtschhorn, 2,096 m
 Hochblanken, 2,068 m
 Klippern, 2,066 m
 Sünser Spitze, 2,062 m
 Gungern, 2,053 m
 Ragazer Blanken, 2,051 m
 Kanisfluh, main summit, 2,044 m
 Hübscher Bühel, 2,032 m

Other important and well-known peaks in the Bregenz Forest Mountains (in order of decreasing height):
 Hohes Licht 2,009 m
 Hoher Freschen 2,004 m
 Hochrohkopf 1,975 m
 Winterstaude 1,877 m
 Hirschberg (Bizau) 1,834 m
 Mörzelspitze, 1,830 m
 Leuenkopf, 1,830 m
 Hangspitze 1,746 m
 Niedere 1,711 m
 Hohe Kugel 1,645 m
 Baumgartenalpe 1,624 m
 Hochälpelekopf, 1,467 m
 Staufen 1,456 m
 Renkknie 1,411 m
 Brüggelekopf 1,182 m
 Hirschberg (Langen) 1,095 m
 Karren 971 m

Nature conservancy 

Due to the remoteness of some areas, there are many nature reserves that can be found in the Bregenz Forest Mountains. 
 Part of the Walserkamm and the whole Glatthorn group lie in the area of the 19,200-hectare UNESCO Biosphere Reserve Großes Walsertal.
 The largest nature reserve area according to Vorarlberg national law, lies in the Bregenzerwald mountains, as well as the smaller nature reserves  and the protected landscapes .

Tourism

Mountain huts 
In the Bregenzerwald mountains there are comparatively few alpine huts with overnight accommodation. This is due to the fact that the majority of the mountain tours can be undertaken as day trips from the valley valleys.

Mountain huts run by the Austrian Alpine Club:
 Freschenhaus (1,846 m): open and serviced from mid-June to mid-October, 20 beds & 30 mattress storage, open but no service during winter with space for 13 camps, valley location: Laterns, walking time from Laterns: 2.5 hours.
 Hochälpelehütte (1,460 m): open and serviced from mid-May to end-October, 16 camps in a mattress storage, also open during winter in accordance with opening times of local cable cars, valley location: Schwarzenberg, walking time from Schwarzenberg: 1.75 hours
 Lustenauer Hütte (1,250 m): open and services from May to October and December – April, 13 camps in a mattress storage, valley location: Schwarzenberg or Bödele, walking time from Schwarzenberg: 2 hours and 1 hour from Bödele 
There are many more huts and restaurants in this region. Therefore, it is advisable to inquire about the exact opening hours and the accessibility of the huts at the Alpenverein or in the valley resorts.

Long-distance routes 
The nordalpine long distance route (DE: Nordalpine Weitwanderweg 01) and the Limestone Alps Way (DE: Kalkalpenweg) runs through the central part of the Bregenzerwald mountain range with the following sections:
 Section 17 runs from Zürs to Damüls
The greater part of this section is still in the Lechquellen Mountains. It is only at the Faschina Pass (Faschinajoch) that the Bregenzerwald Forest is entered.
 Section 18 runs from Damüls to Bregenz via Alpe Portla, Hoher Freschen, Mörzelspitze, Bödele, Dornbirn.
The Via Alpina, a cross-border hiking trail with five partial routes through the whole Alps, runs along the edge of the Bregenzerwald mountain range.

The Red Trail of the Via Alpina runs as follows with two stages through the Bregenzerwald Mountains:
 Stage R54 runs from Buchboden to St. Gerold (only the second half of this stage is in the Bregenzerwald mountains)
 Stage R55 runs from St. Gerold to Feldkirch via Röns, Schnifis and Satteins

Fixed-rope routes 
Geology and geography of the Bregenzerwald Mountains are not exactly conducive to the construction of climbing routes. As easy-to-get-on routes of the simplest level can still apply:

Photo gallery

Literature / maps 
 Dieter Seibert: Alpenvereinsführer  alpin. Bergverlag Rother, München 2008, 

References 

 
Mountain ranges of the Alps
Northern Limestone Alps
Mountain ranges of Vorarlberg
Mountains of Vorarlberg
Vorarlberg